Archibald Lang Fleming FRGS (8 September 188317 May 1953) was the inaugural Bishop of The Arctic from 1933 to 1949.

Biography
Fleming was educated at Greenock Academy and the University of Glasgow. He was in the drawing office at John Brown & Co, a shipyard in Clydebank, until 1906 when he went to Canada to prepare for missionary work at Wycliffe College. Ordained in 1912, he was a missionary in Baffin Island until 1916. Later he was Chaplain of his old theological college then Rector of Saint John, New Brunswick. He was Archdeacon of The Arctic from 1927 to his appointment to the episcopate. He was also a noted author.

John Buchan, Lord Tweedsmuir, the Governor General of Canada, wrote to Fleming on his appointment as Bishop: Your official signature 'Archibald the Arctic' is the most romantic signature in the world and just one point ahead of 'William of Argyll and the Isles'''. Fleming's memoir Archibald the Arctic'' was published in 1957.

References

External links

 

1883 births
People from Greenock
People educated at Greenock Academy
Alumni of the University of Glasgow
Fellows of the Royal Geographical Society
Scottish Anglican missionaries
Anglican archdeacons in North America
Anglican bishops of The Arctic
20th-century Anglican Church of Canada bishops
1953 deaths
Anglican missionaries in Canada